is a railway station in the city of Yurihonjō, Akita Prefecture,  Japan, operated by the third-sector  railway operator Yuri Kōgen Railway.

Lines
Nishitakisawa Station is served by the Chōkai Sanroku Line, and is located 15.7 kilometers from the terminus of the line at Ugo-Honjō Station.

Station layout
The station has one side platform, serving a single bi-directional track. The station is unattended.

Adjacent stations

History
Nishitakisawa Station opened on December 15, 1937 as a station on the Japanese Government Railways (JGR) Yashima Line. The JGR became the Japan National Railway (JNR) after World War II. All freight operations were discontinued from June 10, 1981. The Yashima Line was privatized on 1 October 1985, becoming the Yuri Kōgen Railway Chōkai Sanroku Line. A new station building was completed in December 2003.

Surrounding area

See also
List of railway stations in Japan

External links

Railway stations in Akita Prefecture
Railway stations in Japan opened in 1937
Yurihonjō